Diacheopsis is a genus of slime molds in the family Lamprodermataceae. , there are 16 species in the genus.

Species
Diacheopsis depressa
Diacheopsis effusa
Diacheopsis insessa
Diacheopsis kowalskii
Diacheopsis laxifila
Diacheopsis metallica
Diacheopsis minuta
Diacheopsis mitchellii
Diacheopsis nannengae
Diacheopsis pauxilla
Diacheopsis pieninica
Diacheopsis reticulospora
Diacheopsis rigidifila
Diacheopsis serpula
Diacheopsis synspora
Diacheopsis vermicularis

References

Myxogastria
Amoebozoa genera